Fallugia is a monotypic genus of flowering plants containing the single species Fallugia paradoxa, which is known by the common names Apache plume and póñil. This plant is native to the southwestern United States and northern Mexico, where it is found in arid habitats such as desert woodlands and scrub.

Description
Fallugia paradoxa is an erect shrub not exceeding two meters in height. It has light gray or whitish peeling bark on its many thin branches. The leaves are each about a centimeter long and deeply lobed with the edges rolled under. The upper surface of the leaf is green and hairy while the underside is duller in color and scaly.

The flower is roselike when new, with rounded white petals and a center filled with many thready stamens and pistils. The ovary of the flower remains after the white petals fall away, leaving many plumelike lavender styles, each 3 to 5 centimeters long. The plant may be covered with these dark pinkish clusters of curling, feathery styles after flowering. Each style is attached to a developing fruit, which is a small achene. The fruit is dispersed when the wind catches the styles and blows them away. Wasps such as Polistes instabilis commonly feed on its nectar.

Uses
Fallugia paradoxa is considered valuable for erosion control in desert areas where it grows.

References

External links

Jepson Manual Treatment - Fallugia paradoxa
USDA Plants Profile; Fallugia paradoxa
Ecology
Fallugia paradoxa - Photo gallery

Colurieae
Monotypic Rosaceae genera
Flora of the California desert regions
North American desert flora
Flora of the Southwestern United States
Flora of New Mexico
Flora without expected TNC conservation status